Ronald Campbell may refer to:

Ronald Bruce Campbell (1878–1963), British fencer
Ronald Hugh Campbell (1883–1953), British diplomat and ambassador to France on the eve of World War II
Ronald Ian Campbell (1890–1983), British diplomat and former ambassador to Egypt
Ronnie Campbell (born 1943), British Labour MP for Blyth Valley
Ronnie R. Campbell (1954–2022), American politician, member of the Virginia House of Delegates
Ron Campbell (ice hockey) (Ronald Campbell, born 1957), American National Hockey League (NHL) executive
Ron Campbell (animator) (1939–2021), animator, director, and producer
Ron Campbell (baseball) (born 1940), right-handed infielder in Major League Baseball
Ronald W. F. Campbell (1946–1998), Professor of Cardiology at the Freeman Hospital in Newcastle upon Tyne, internationally known as an expert in the field of electrophysiology. The British Cardiovascular Society set up a memorial lecture in his honour (Ronnie Campbell Lecture)

See also
Ronald Campbell Gunn (1808–1881), English-born Australian botanist and politician